Plum sauce is a viscous, light-brown sweet and sour condiment. It is used in Cantonese cuisine as a dip for deep-fried dishes, such as spring rolls, noodles, and deep-fried chicken balls as well as for roast duck. It is made from sweet plums or other fruit such as peach, pineapple or apricot, along with sugar, vinegar, salt, ginger and chili peppers.

Detroit-style plum sauce is a popular take on Chinese-American plum sauce found in most Chinese restaurants in the southeastern Michigan area. It is a watery, sweet, vinegar-based sauce that offers a much stronger flavor.

See also

 Duck sauce: an American-Chinese sweet sour fruit sauce
 Sweet and sour sauce: several kinds
 Tkemali: plum sauce of Georgia (Caucasus)
 Mumbo sauce: trade name of an American sauce
 Hoisin sauce: sauce based on fermented soybean paste
 Oyster sauce
 Siu haau sauce: a primary Chinese barbecue sauce
 Soy sauce: a saline sauce based on fermented soybean
 Chamoy: a Mexican savory fruit sauce
 List of dips
 List of Chinese sauces
 List of sauces

References

Chinese condiments
Chinese sauces
Plum dishes